The American Center is a high-rise tower in the Metro Detroit suburb of Southfield, Michigan, built in 1975 as the corporate headquarters for the automaker American Motors Corporation (AMC), which was subsequently acquired by Chrysler Corporation in 1987.  The building is located adjacent to Interstate 696, M-10, and US 24 interchange.

Upgraded in 2001, the office tower has 27 floors, including a basement, and has been owned and managed since 2017 by Redico, a Southfield-based real estate developer.

Architecture
The structural system consists of trussed steel frame. Designed as a modern architecture tower, the curtain wall facade was originally golden glass. The tower is square in plan, with chamfered corners. The elevator core is unusual in that it is rotated 45 degrees relative to the tower's axis. The building also includes a parking garage and retail spaces. It has a Leadership in Energy and Environmental Design (LEED) "Certified Silver" designation.

Development
AMC announced in 1973 that it would move to a new building in Southfield, the American Motors Corporation Office Building. In 1975 AMC moved its corporate offices to the glass-and-steel skyscraper in Southfield, joining the exodus of companies from Detroit. The company continued its automotive design and engineering operations at its historic Plymouth Road complex (14250 Plymouth Road) in Detroit, as Chrysler did for a time after acquiring AMC.

The building was owned by Charter One Bank (which as of 2004 was owned by Citizens Financial Group.

See also 
Architecture of metropolitan Detroit
Southfield Town Center

Notes

Sources

External links 
 Google Maps location of American Center
 Google Maps location of the Mixing Bowl
 

Skyscrapers in Southfield, Michigan
American Motors
Modernist architecture in Michigan
Skyscraper office buildings in Michigan
Office buildings completed in 1975